The women's +67 kg competition in Taekwondo at the 2020 Summer Olympics was held on 27 July 2021, at the Makuhari Messe Hall A.

Results

Main bracket

Athletes will not be disqualified for positive COVID-19 test at Tokyo 2020, will appear with DNS (Did not started)

Repechage

References

External links
Draw 

Women's +67 kg
Women's events at the 2020 Summer Olympics
2021 in women's taekwondo